Epicephala scythropis is a moth of the family Gracillariidae. It is known from India and Myanmar.

The larvae feed on Phyllanthus species. They probably mine the leaves of their host plant.

References

Epicephala
Moths described in 1930